Rıza Şen (born 8 March 1986) is a Turkish footballer who plays as a right midfielder for Kemerspor 2003.

Career 
Şen had involved in amateur football at a very early age of 11. He had begun football at GOP Taşköprüspor, and respectively played at Karadeniz S.K. until his Beşitaş transfer. He had his debut on the match against Kayseri Erciyesspor in June 2006. Şen had several chances to play football on professional level in lower leagues at different teams. He returned Beşiktaş in 2008 as a part of senior squad and subsequently loaned out to Bank Asya 1st League side Kasımpaşa SK.

References

External links
 TFF Profile
 

1986 births
Living people
Turkish footballers
Turkey youth international footballers
Association football midfielders
Beşiktaş J.K. footballers
Zeytinburnuspor footballers
Arsinspor footballers
Turanspor footballers
Eyüpspor footballers
Kasımpaşa S.K. footballers
Orduspor footballers
Alanyaspor footballers
Gaziosmanpaşaspor footballers
Kartalspor footballers
Süper Lig players
TFF First League players
TFF Second League players